Lilium GmbH is a German aerospace company which is the developer of the Lilium Jet, an electrically powered personal air vehicle capable of VTOL flight.

History
Lilium GmbH was founded in 2015 by four engineers and PhD students at the Technical University of Munich, Daniel Wiegand, Sebastian Born, Matthias Meiner and Patrick Nathen.

The Lilium Eagle, an unmanned two-seat proof of concept model, performed its maiden flight at the airfield Mindelheim-Mattsies near Munich in Germany on 20 April 2017. The Lilium Jet five-seater prototype Phoenix first flew in May 2019. The prototype was powered by 36 electrically-powered jacketed-propellers mounted in movable flaps that can point down for vertical takeoff and gradually moved to a horizontal position to provide forward thrust. The five-seat Lilium Jet is capable of achieving a top speed of 300km/h and targets a range of 300 km. In 2017, Lilium announced plans to launch a 5-seat Lilium Jet by 2025, aimed for the air taxi service market. At the beginning of 2019, Lilium held discussions with Switzerland's national rail company SBB on the use of the air taxi as a means of transport between the station and the home and a letter of intent was signed. In October 2019, Lilium released footage showing the Jet in full flight, taking off vertically and transitioning to horizontal flight. Lilium also announced the completion of its first manufacturing facility in October 2019. In November 2020, Lilium announced a partnership with the developer Tavistock Development Company to build a $25 million “vertiport” in Orlando, Florida.

, the registered office of Lilium GmbH was in Weßling (Wessling) near Gilching in Bavaria, Germany. Lilium completed a new financing round of $90 million in September 2017. From May 2018 to November 2019, the car designer Frank Stephenson was chief designer for Lilium. He previously worked for BMW and designed various sports car brands. Also in 2018, Arnd Mueller, previously Chief Brand Marketing Officer & GM Esprit Image GmbH-Member of the Executive Management Team, became VP Marketing of Lilium. He is to build the air taxi development company and its product into an international brand. In September 2018, Yann de Vries, formerly partner at Atomico, became the new VP of corporate development Lilium. 

In July 2019, Lilium announced London, UK as its base to develop its software engineering team. The engineering team is led by Carlos Morgado, former chief technology officer of Just Eat. Luca Benassi, a former Airbus executive with experience at Boeing and NASA, has been named Lilium’s chief development engineer. Yves Yemsi who worked as head of program quality for Airbus A350 aircraft has been hired as chief program officer. Dirk Gebser has joined as vice president of production.

In March 2020, Lilium raised $240 million in funding led by Tencent, with participation of previous backers such as Atomico, Freigeist and LGT. In January 2021 it was reported that Lilium was seeking to become a listed company via a special-purpose acquisition company (SPAC, also called a "blank check" company); the company completed a SPAC merger in September 2021. The company also confirmed it was redesigning its aircraft.
Former Airbus CEO, Tom Enders, joined Lilium's board of directors in January 2021. In early June of 2022 it was announced that Klaus Roewe would become CEO of Lilium on August 1, replacing Daniel Wiegand. 

In August 2021 the Brazilian airline Azul signed a letter of intent for 220 Lilium Jet seven-seaters.

Controversy 
In January 2020 Aerokurier published a report which stated that Lilium could not meet its stated aircraft performance goals and would only be able to fly for two minutes at a time. The anonymously-authored report was  dismissed by the company but later backed up by four German aerospace academics who wrote that Lilium was "using brilliant PR to create an illusory world to attract investors."

In February 2021, Forbes published an article citing a number of former employees that stated the development of Lilium's aircraft was "dogged by problems and that the flight test campaign made minimal progress."

Awards and recognition 
In 2018, Lilium was named as the management team of the year - industrial goods as the silver Stevie winner of the Stevie Awards.

In July 2019, the Lilium five-seater Jet received a Red Dot Award: Design Concept for "Best of the Best".

In 2019, Lilium was named second in LinkedIn Germany's 'Top Startups' list.

In 2021 the Lilium Jet won the IF Gold Award in the discipline of Professional Concept.

See also
 eVTOL

References

External links
 Official website

Aviation companies
Manufacturing companies based in Munich
Technology companies established in 2015
German companies established in 2015
Urban air mobility